Chaos and the Calm is the debut studio album by English singer-songwriter James Bay. It was first released on 15 December 2014 via Republic Records.

The album was nominated for a Grammy Award for Best Rock Album, while the song "Hold Back the River" was nominated for Best Rock Song and Bay for Best New Artist.

Critical reception

Chaos and the Calm received mixed reviews from music critics. At Metacritic, which assigns a normalised rating out of 100 to reviews from mainstream critics, the album received an average score of 58, which indicates "mixed or average reviews", based on 9 reviews.

Commercial performance
Chaos and the Calm debuted at number one on the UK Albums Chart on 29 March 2015, having sold over 64,000 copies in the first week of release.

Track listing

Charts and certifications

Weekly charts

Year-end charts

Decade-end charts

Certifications

Release history

References

2014 debut albums
James Bay (singer) albums
Albums produced by Jacquire King
Republic Records albums